Apple Grove is a census-designated place (CDP) in Mason County, West Virginia, United States, on the Ohio River located along West Virginia Route 2. Apple Grove lies just south of Gallipolis Ferry. As of the 2010 census, its population was 204. It is part of the Point Pleasant, WV–OH Micropolitan Statistical Area.

Climate
The climate in this area is characterized by relatively high temperatures and evenly distributed precipitation throughout the year.  According to the Köppen Climate Classification system, Apple Grove has a humid subtropical climate, abbreviated "Cfa" on climate maps.

References

Census-designated places in Mason County, West Virginia
Census-designated places in West Virginia
Point Pleasant micropolitan area
West Virginia populated places on the Ohio River